Alarms in the Heart is the second and final studio album from English folk rock band Dry the River and was released 25 August 2014. The album includes the singles "Gethsemane" and "Everlasting Light".

Singles 
 "Gethsemane" was released as the album's lead single on 16 June 2014.
 "Everlasting Light" was released as the album's second single on 21 July 2014.

Track listing

Release history

References

2014 albums
Dry the River albums
Transgressive Records albums